Thomas J. Galbraith (1825–1909) was an American politician. In 1857, he signed the Republican version of the Minnesota State Constitution. Galbraith served in the Minnesota Territorial House of Representatives in 1856. He then served the 18th district in the Minnesota State Senate in 1861, living in Scott County at the time. In 1862, Galbraith worked as an Indian agent for the Bureau of Indian Affairs at the Lower Sioux Agency, succeeding Joseph R. Brown.

On August 15, 1862, he was involved in a confrontation with  Mdewakanton tribesmen and his trading partner Andrew Myrick at the Lower Sioux Agency.  Galbraith refused to distribute food on credit, although they were suffering hunger and the government's treaty annuity was late. It proved one of many causes of the Dakota War of 1862 that began twelve days later.  Myrick, who made derogatory comments in the incident, was killed on August 18, 1862 while Galbraith managed to escape. When the hostilities were over he compiled a list of the known Minnesotans casualties both civilian and military.  He died in Cheyenne, Wyoming February 3,1909, where he was a resident for many years .

References

Index to Politicians: Galbraith. The Political Graveyard.
Thomas Galbraith at Find A Grave

1825 births
1909 deaths
Members of the Minnesota Territorial Legislature
19th-century American politicians
Minnesota state senators
People of Minnesota in the American Civil War
Dakota War of 1862
United States Indian agents